Muuratjärvi is a lake of Finland in Muurame and Korpilahti, Jyväskylä, with a surface area of 32 km2. It has got several islands like, Siikasaari, Konttisaari, Jahko and Raita. Vuohensalo is only island which can be accessed by car.

See also
List of lakes in Finland

References

Kansalaisen karttapaikka. Map of Muuratjärvi 
Fishing in Muuratjärvi. Kalapaikka.net

External links

Landforms of Central Finland
Lakes of Muurame
Lakes of Jyväskylä